Retinal pigment epithelium-specific 65 kDa protein, also known as retinoid isomerohydrolase, is an enzyme of the vertebrate visual cycle that is encoded in humans by the RPE65 gene. RPE65 is expressed in the retinal pigment epithelium (RPE, a layer of epithelial cells that nourish the photoreceptor cells) and is responsible for the conversion of all-trans-retinyl esters to 11-cis-retinol during phototransduction. 11-cis-retinol is then used in visual pigment regeneration in photoreceptor cells. RPE65 belongs to the carotenoid oxygenase family of enzymes.

Function 

RPE65 is a critical enzyme in the vertebrate visual cycle found in the retinal pigmented epithelium. It is also found in rods and cones. The photoisomerization of 11-cis-retinal to all-trans-retinal initiates the phototransduction pathway through which the brain detects light. All-trans-retinol is not photoactive and therefore must be reconverted to 11-cis-retinal before it can recombine with opsin to form an active visual pigment. RPE65 reverses the photoisomerization by converting an all-trans-retinyl ester to 11-cis-retinol.  Most commonly, the ester substrate is retinyl palmitate. The other enzymes of the visual cycle complete the reactions necessary to oxidize and esterify all-trans-retinol to a retinyl ester (RPE65's substrate) and to oxidize 11-cis-retinol to 11-cis-retinal (the required photoactive visual pigment component). 

RPE65 is also referred to as retinol isomerase or retinoid isomerase, owing to past debates about the enzyme's substrate and whether it was involved in ester hydrolysis.

Structure 

RPE65 is a dimer of two symmetrical, enzymatically independent subunits. The active site of each subunit has a seven-bladed beta-propeller structure with four histidines that hold an iron(II) cofactor. This structural motif is common across the studied members of the carotenoid oxygenase family of enzymes.  RPE65 is strongly associated with the membrane of the smooth endoplasmic reticulum in RPE cells.

Active site structure 
The active site of each RPE65 active site contains an Fe(II) cofactor bound by four histidines (His180, His241, His313, and His527), each contributed by a separate blade on the beta-propeller structure. Three of the four histidines are coordinated to nearby glutamic acid residues (Glu148, Glu417, and Glu469), which are thought to help position the histidines to bind the iron cofactor in an octahedral geometry. Phe103, Thr147, and Glu148 surround the active site where they help stabilize the carbocation intermediate and increase the stereoselectivity of RPE65 for 11-cis-retinol over 13-cis-retinol.

Reactants and products likely enter and leave the active site through a hydrophobic tunnel which is thought to open into the lipid membrane for direct lipid substrate absorption. A second, smaller tunnel also reaches the active site and may serve as a pathway for water, but is too narrow to transport the retinoid reactants and products.

Membrane interactions 

RPE65 is strongly associated with the membrane of the sER. sER is abnormally abundant in RPE cells due to their role in processing lipidic retinoids. Structural studies indicate that RPE65 is partially imbedded in the sER membrane via interactions between its hydrophobic face and the interior of the lipid membrane. This is supported by the need for detergent to solubilize RPE65. A major portion of RPE65's hydrophobic face, residues 109–126, forms an amphipathic alpha helix that likely contributes to the protein's membrane affinity. Additionally, Cys112 is palmitoylated in native RPE65, further supporting the theory that the hydrophobic face of RPE65 is imbedded in the membrane.

The hydrophobic face contains the entrance to the large tunnel that leads to the enzyme's active site. The presence of this channel on the hydrophobic face combined with RPE65's demonstrated ability to absorb substrate direction from the lipid bilayer is consistent with RPE65 being partially embedded in the membrane.

Conservation 

RPE65 has been isolated from a wide range of vertebrates including zebra fish, chicken, mice, frogs, and humans. Its structure is highly conserved between species, particularly in the beta-propeller and likely membrane bound regions. The amino acid sequences of human and bovine RPE65 differ by less than 1%. The histidine residues of the beta-propeller structure and the bound iron(II) cofactor are 100% conserved across studied RPE65 orthologs and other members of the carotenoid oxygenase family.

Soluble RPE65 (sRPE65) 

Previously, it was proposed that RPE65 exists in two, interconverted forms: membrane bound mRPE65 and soluble sRPE65. This theory suggested that the reversible conversion of sRPE65 to mRPE65 by palmitoylation at Cys231, Cys329, and Cys330 played a role in regulating the retinoid cycle and endowing mRPE65 with its membrane affinity. However, crystallographic studies of RPE65 have demonstrated that these residues are neither palmitoylated nor surface facing. New studies have also failed to confirm the presence of abundant soluble RPE65. Thus, this theory has been largely abandoned.

Mechanism 

RPE65 catalyzes the conversion of all-trans-retinyl ester to 11-cis-retinol through a proposed SN1 O-alkyl bond cleavage. RPE65's combination of an O-alkyl ester cleavage, geometric isomerization, and water addition is currently thought to be unique in biology. However, O-alkyl ester cleavage reactions with similarly stabilized carbocation intermediates are used by organic chemists.

O-Alkyl cleavage 

The O-alkyl cleavage of the ester bond, assisted by an Fe(II) cofactor, creates a carbocation intermediate that is stabilized by the conjugated polyene chain. The delocalization of the carbocation reduces the bond order of the polyene chain, thereby reducing the activation energy of the trans-to-cis isomerization. Phe103 and Thr178 additionally stabilize the isomerized carbocation and are thought to be responsible for the stereoselectivity of the enzyme. After isomerization, a nucleophilic attack by water at C15 restores the conjugation of the polyene chain and completes the ester bond cleavage.

Alternate SN2 mechanism 
Nearly all other biochemical ester hydrolysis reactions occur through an addition-elimination reaction at the acyl carbon. However, isotope labeling studies have demonstrated that the oxygen on the final 11-cis-retinol product of RPE65 originates from the solvent rather than the reacting ester, supporting the O-alkyl cleavage mechanism. Another possible mechanism would begin with a nucleophilic attack at C11, but such an attack would rely on some nucleophile - most likely a cystine residue - to complete the isomerization portion of the reaction. Not only is the polyenyl ester probably not electron-poor enough to allow this reaction, but the active site region is lacking cystine residues to act as the nucleophile.

Clinical significance 

Mutations in this gene have been associated with Leber's congenital amaurosis type 2 (LCA2) and retinitis pigmentosa (RP). RPE65 mutations are the most commonly detected mutations in LCA patients in Denmark. The vast majority of RPE65 mutations in patients with LCA2 and RP occur in the beta-propeller regime and are believed to inhibit proper protein folding and iron cofactor binding. Particularly common propeller mutation sites are Tyr368 and His182. Substitution at Arg91 is also common and have been shown to impact RPE65 membrane interactions and substrate uptake.

Though complete loss of function is associated with diseases such as LCA and RP, partial inhibition of RPE65 has been proposed as a treatment for age-related macular degeneration (AMD). All-trans-retinylamine (Ret-NH2) and emixustat have both been shown to competitively inhibit RPE65. Emixustat is currently undergoing FDA phase 3 clinical trials as a therapy for AMD.

Jean Bennett and Katherine A. High's work with the RPE65 mutation has reversed an inherited form of blindness. They received the first FDA approval of a gene therapy for a genetic disease, which is called Voretigene neparvovec. For their scientific achievements Jean Bennett and Katherine A. High were named as one of three finalists in 2018 for Sanford Health's $1 million Lorraine Cross Award for innovation in science and medicine.

See also 
 The Visual Cycle

References

Further reading 

 Protein Structure and Function
 
 
 
 Clinical and Genetic Studies

External links 
  GeneReviews/NIH/NCBI/UW entry on Retinitis Pigmentosa Overview